Arachnis zuni, the zuni tiger-moth, is a moth of the family Erebidae. It was described by Berthold Neumoegen in 1890. It is found in North America from New Mexico to Arizona and Mexico.

References

Moths described in 1890
Spilosomina
Moths of North America